Shawan may refer to:

 Shawan, Missouri

China 
 Shanwan, Hongjiang (沙湾乡), a township of Hongjiang City, Hunan
 Shawan (lit. "Sandy Bay"), a settlement in Shandong; see 1452 Yellow River floods
 Shawan Ancient Town, a township in Panyu District of Guangzhou City, Guangdong
 Shawan, Xinjiang, a county-level city in Xinjiang Uyghur Autonomous Region
 Shawan District, in Leshan Prefecture-Level City, Sichuan

People
 Shawan Jabarin (born 1960), general director of Al-Haq
 Shawan Robinson (born 1983), American professional basketball player
 Jeff Shawan (born 1956/1957), American politician

See also
 Gumaa Al-Shawan (1937–2011), Egyptian spy
 Aziz El-Shawan (1916–1993), Egyptian composers